Abarema obovata, the obovate abarema, is a species of plant in the family Fabaceae. It is endemic to the wooded hillsides of east and north-central Minas Gerais, Brazil.

References

obovata
Endemic flora of Brazil
Vulnerable plants
Taxonomy articles created by Polbot